The Peters's pipistrelle (Hypsugo petersi) is a species of vesper bat in the family Vespertilionidae. It is found in Indonesia, Malaysia, and the Philippines.

Formerly classified in the genus Falsistrellus, phylogenetic evidence supports it belonging to the genus Hypsugo.

References

Hypsugo
Mammals described in 1899
Taxa named by Christian Erich Hermann von Meyer
Bats of Southeast Asia
Bats of Indonesia
Bats of Malaysia
Mammals of Borneo
Mammals of the Philippines
Taxonomy articles created by Polbot
Taxobox binomials not recognized by IUCN